The DC Comics character Batman has been adapted into various media including film, radio, television, and video games, as well as numerous merchandising items. The Batman franchise''' has become one of the highest-grossing media franchises of all time.

Film

Early films and serials

Live-action
A number of Batman theatrical films have been made. There have also been several attempted projects during the hiatus between Batman & Robin and Batman Begins.

Serials
1943: Batman; 15 chapters starring Lewis Wilson as Batman and Douglas Croft as Robin
1949: Batman and Robin; 15 chapters starring Robert Lowery as Batman and Johnny Duncan as Robin

Batman
In 1966, a Batman feature film based on the contemporaneous Batman television series was released. It starred Adam West as Batman, Burt Ward as Robin, Cesar Romero as the Joker, Burgess Meredith as the Penguin, Frank Gorshin as the Riddler, and Lee Meriwether as Catwoman.

Tim Burton and Joel Schumacher series

The Dark Knight Trilogy

 DC Extended Universe 

 The Batman shared universe 

Animated

Featuring Batman
1993: Batman: Mask of the Phantasm, an animated theatrical feature tie-in for Batman: The Animated Series; starring Kevin Conroy as Batman, Mark Hamill as the Joker, and Dana Delany as Andrea Beaumont/The Phantasm
1998: Subzero, set in the continuity of Batman: The Animated Series, with Kevin Conroy voicing Batman
2000: Return of the Joker, set in the continuity of Batman Beyond, with Will Friedle and Kevin Conroy voicing Batman
2003: Mystery of the Batwoman, set in the continuity of The New Batman Adventures, with Kevin Conroy voicing Batman
2005: The Batman vs. Dracula, set in the continuity of The Batman, with Rino Romano voicing Batman
2008: Batman: Gotham Knight, a collection of 6 original shorts with different animation styles, with Kevin Conroy voicing Batman.
2010: Under the Red Hood, an adaptation of Batman: Under the Hood, with Bruce Greenwood voicing Batman
2011: Year One, an adaptation of Batman: Year One, with Benjamin McKenzie voicing Batman
2012: Batman: The Dark Knight Returns - Part 1, an adaptation of the first half of The Dark Knight Returns, with Peter Weller voicing Batman
2013: The Dark Knight Returns - Part 2, an adaptation of the second half of The Dark Knight Returns, with Peter Weller voicing Batman
2013: DC Super Heroes Unite with Troy Baker voicing Batman
2014: Son of Batman, a loose adaptation of Batman and Son, with Jason O'Mara voicing Batman
2014: Assault on Arkham, set in the continuity of Batman: Arkham, with Kevin Conroy voicing Batman
2015: Batman vs. Robin, a loose adaptation of Court of Owls, with Jason O'Mara voicing Batman
2015: Batman Unlimited: Animal Instincts, with Roger Craig Smith voicing Batman
2015: Batman Unlimited: Monster Mayhem, with Roger Craig Smith voicing Batman
2016: Batman Unlimited: Mechs vs. Mutants, with Roger Craig Smith voicing Batman
2016: Batman: Bad Blood, an animated film also featuring Batwoman and Batwing with Jason O'Mara voicing Batman and Sean Maher voicing Dick Grayson/Nightwing as Batman
2016: Batman: The Killing Joke, an adaptation of Batman: The Killing Joke, with Kevin Conroy voicing Batman
2016: Batman: Return of the Caped Crusaders, an animated film based on the contemporaneous Batman television series; starring Adam West as Batman, Burt Ward as Robin, and Julie Newmar as Catwoman
2017: Batman and Harley Quinn, an original animated film set in the continuity of Batman: The Animated Series and The New Batman Adventures, with Kevin Conroy reprising his role as Batman.
2017: Batman vs. Two-Face, an animated film based on the 1960s Batman television series; starring Adam West as Batman, Burt Ward as Robin, and Julie Newmar as Catwoman.
2018: Batman: Gotham by Gaslight, an animated film based on the graphic novel, with Bruce Greenwood voicing Batman.
2018: Batman Ninja, a Japanese CG-animated film by Kamikaze Douga, with Kōichi Yamadera and Roger Craig Smith voicing Batman in Japanese and English respectively.
2019: Batman: Hush, an animated film based on the Batman: Hush comic book story arc, with Jason O'Mara voicing Batman
2019: Lego DC Batman: Family Matters, with Troy Baker reprising his role.
2020: Batman: Death in the Family, with Bruce Greenwood reprising his role from various DC media.
2021: Batman: Soul of the Dragon, an original story with David Giuntoli voicing Batman
2021: Batman: The Long Halloween, Parts One and Two, with Jensen Ackles voicing Batman

Team-ups
1997: The Batman/Superman Movie: World's Finest2008: Justice League: The New Frontier, based on the comic of the same name, with Jeremy Sisto voicing Batman
2009: Superman/Batman: Public Enemies, based on the comic of the same name, with Kevin Conroy voicing Batman
2010: Justice League: Crisis on Two Earths, a loose adaptation of various DC comics, with William Baldwin voicing Batman
2010: Superman/Batman: Apocalypse, based on Superman/Batman: The Supergirl from Krypton, with Kevin Conroy voicing Batman
2012: Justice League: Doom, based on JLA: Tower of Babel, with Kevin Conroy voicing Batman
2013: Justice League: The Flashpoint Paradox, based on Flashpoint, with Kevin McKidd and Kevin Conroy voicing Batman
2014: JLA Adventures: Trapped in Time, an original story with Diedrich Bader voicing Batman
2014: Justice League: War, based on Justice League: Origin, with Jason O'Mara voicing Batman
2014: Lego DC Comics: Batman Be-Leaguered animated television special, with Troy Baker reprising his role as Batman from the Lego video games
2015: Justice League: Throne of Atlantis, based on Throne of Atlantis, with Jason O'Mara reprising his role
2015: Lego DC Comics Super Heroes: Justice League vs. Bizarro League, with Troy Baker reprising his role
2015: Justice League: Gods and Monsters, with Michael C. Hall voicing Batman
2015: Lego DC Comics Super Heroes: Justice League – Attack of the Legion of Doom, with Troy Baker reprising his role
2016: Lego DC Comics Super Heroes: Justice League: Cosmic Clash, with Troy Baker reprising his role
2016: Justice League vs. Teen Titans, with Jason O'Mara reprising his role
2016: Lego DC Comics Super Heroes: Justice League: Gotham City Breakout, with Troy Baker reprising his role
2017: Justice League Dark, with Jason O'Mara reprising his role
2018: Lego DC Comics Super Heroes: The Flash, with Troy Baker reprising his role
2018: Lego DC Comics Super Heroes: Aquaman: Rage of Atlantis, with Troy Baker reprising his role
2018: Scooby-Doo! & Batman: The Brave and the Bold, with Diedrich Bader reprising his role
2018: Teen Titans Go! To the Movies, based on Teen Titans Go!, with Jimmy Kimmel voicing Batman
2018: The Death of Superman, with Jason O'Mara reprising his role
2019: Reign of the Supermen, with Jason O'Mara reprising his role
2019: Justice League vs. the Fatal Five, set in the DCAU, with Kevin Conroy reprising his role
2019: Batman vs. Teenage Mutant Ninja Turtles, with Troy Baker reprising his role
2020: Lego DC: Shazam!: Magic and Monsters, with Troy Baker reprising his role
2020: Superman: Red Son, with Roger Craig Smith voicing Batman
2020: Justice League Dark: Apokolips War, with Jason O'Mara reprising his role from various DC media
2021: Injustice, with Anson Mount voicing Batman
2022: DC League of Super-Pets, with Keanu Reeves voicing Batman
2022: Batman and Superman: Battle of the Super Sons, with Troy Baker reprising his role from various Lego DC direct-to-video films and video games and DC media
2023: Legion of Super-Heroes, with Jensen Ackles reprising his role as Batman

Web series
2015: Justice League: Gods and Monsters Chronicles, with Michael C. Hall voicing a Kirk Langstrom version of Batman
2015: Batman Unlimited, with Roger Craig Smith voicing Batman

Other
2014: A Lego-themed version of Batman appears in The Lego Movie, voiced by Will Arnett
2017: The Lego Batman Movie, with Arnett reprising his role
2019: The Lego Movie 2: The Second Part, with Will Arnett reprising his role.

Television

Live-action
Batman (TV series)

The series premiered January 12, 1966, on ABC and ended March 14, 1968, starring Adam West as Bruce Wayne / Batman and Burt Ward as Dick Grayson / Robin. West and Ward later reprise their roles in Legends of the Superheroes.

Birds of Prey

The series premiered on October 29, 2002, and used footage of Michael Keaton as Batman and Michelle Pfeiffer as Catwoman, from Tim Burton's Batman Returns in the initial trailers for the series and its opening montage. The series focuses on the couple's daughter, Helena Kyle / Huntress.

Gotham

The series premiered September 22, 2014, on FOX and ended April 25, 2019, starring David Mazouz as a young Bruce Wayne. The series depicts young Bruce Wayne following the death of his parents. Also Bruce is 12 years old when his parents die, unlike his traditional age being 7 or 8 years old. When the series reached its finale, stunt performer Mikhail Mudrik served as the physical actor for Wayne as Mazouz still wasn't 6 foot 4, the showrunners height preference for their Batman Mazouz was able wear the Batsuit in the final shot with the help of forced perspective. He also lent his voice to all Batman speaking scenes in the last episode.

Titans

Batman is mentioned several times in the series. He was shown from behind in the episode "Origins" and was voiced by an uncredited actor. Batman appearing in the first season finale in a dream sequence created by Trigon where he started killing his enemies causing Dick Grayson to end Batman's life. Stunt doubles Alain Moussi and Maxim Savarias portray Batman in that appearance.

Batman's alter ego Bruce makes his full appearance in the second season, portrayed by Iain Glen. Bruce is visited by Dick after the defeat of Trigon, allowing Dick to restart the Titans on the condition that Jason Todd be a member. In his self-titled episode, Bruce appears in Dick's hallucinations about the guilt he felt following a disastrous fight with Deathstroke. In the episode "E.L._.O.," Koriand'r / Starfire, Rachel Roth / Raven, Donna Troy, and Dawn Granger / Dove are lured to the Elko Diner by Bruce in an effort to reunite the team after Dick was incarcerated at Kane County Correctional Facility. In the episode "Nightwing," Bruce attends Donna's funeral at Titans Tower. When Kory thanks Bruce for bringing them together, Bruce had no knowledge of going to Elko and claimed that they confused him with someone else.

In the third season, Bruce becomes distraught after Jason is killed by the Joker, prompting him to murder the latter in Arkham Asylum. He then tasks Dick with the duty of protecting Gotham, while he retreats elsewhere. At a secluded mansion, Bruce writes his will, then attempts to commit suicide by having the mansion burn down with him inside. He is however saved by a resurrected Donna. At the end of the season, Bruce returns to Gotham and reconciles with Jason, who has since been resurrected and gone on rampage as Red Hood, but converted by the Titans to stop Jonathan Crane. While he does not appear in the fourth season, Bruce is mentioned by S.T.A.R. Labs director Bernard Fitzmartin as having provided the team with new equipment to help them continue their crime fighting activities.

Batwoman

Bruce Wayne appears briefly on a magazine cover in The CW's Batwoman season one finale, portrayed by Warren Christie. The character Thomas Elliot masquerades as Wayne in the opening episode of season two before being discovered and forcibly unmasked by Ryan Wilder. In the episode "Armed and Dangerous", a subconscious manifestation of Bruce Wayne appeared before Luke Fox after he was shot by Russell Tavaroff in the previous episode which landed Luke in a coma. Bruce gave Luke the choice of living or dying. After being purged of "Circe" in the season two finale, Kate leaves Gotham City with plans to find Bruce.

An alternate universe version of Batman is portrayed by Kevin Conroy in the special Crisis on Infinite Earths.

Gotham KnightsBatwoman's writers and producers Natalie Abrams, Chad Fiveash and James Stoteraux are in development of a live action Gotham Knights TV series for the CW and Berlanti Productions. A pilot order was confirmed in February 2022.

Animation
Super Friends
1973–86: Various Super Friends series produced by Hanna-Barbera; Olan Soule again reprises his role as Batman in all but the last two Super Friends series, where he is replaced by Adam West.
1973–74: Super Friends1977–78: The All-New Super Friends Hour1978–79: Challenge of the Super Friends1979–80: The World's Greatest Super Friends1980–83: Super Friends1984–85: Super Friends: The Legendary Super Powers Show1985–86: The Super Powers Team: Galactic Guardians1977–78: The New Adventures of Batman, produced by Filmation; while the H-B-produced Super Friends ran on ABC, Adam West and Burt Ward (Robin) voiced their previously live-action roles for this CBS cartoon series; later rerun as part of The Batman/Tarzan Adventure Hour (the Tarzan segments had also been previously seen as their own series)

DC Animated Universe
1992–2006: In The DC animated universe produced by Warner Bros. Animation; Batman is a major character and is voiced by Kevin Conroy in all appearances. He is also the only character to appear in each show produced at least once. For Batman: The Animated Series (1992–95) Conroy, taking inspiration from the main protagonist Sir Percy Blakeney from the film The Scarlet Pimpernel used two different voice tones to differentiate both Bruce Wayne and Batman, an upbeat tone for the former and a more gruff one with the latter. Although in later series he uses only one voice tone for both characters, this is in line with his characterization as in the first series he is depicted with a much warmer and sunnier personality and in the later ones shows a noticeably more stern, blunt, and cold personality:
1992–95: Batman: The Animated Series; the first series of the DCAU. Batman is approximately in the ninth year of his crime-fighting career; he spends much of his time fighting crime solo, as Dick Grayson/Robin by then is in college and therefore works with him semi-regularly, but unlike other iterations of the character who portray themselves as a not-too bright playboy in public, he portrays himself as intelligent and actively involved in managing Wayne Enterprises, to such an extent where in "Eternal Youth" he threatens an employee with termination unless he cancels an unauthorised deal made behind his back and in the final episode produced "Batgirl Returns" he is away on a business trip and thus takes time away from crime-fighting. He is also shown to be close friends with Harvey Dent prior to his transformation into "Two-Face" as well as regularly dating Selina Kyle as Bruce Wayne in addition to them dealing with each other in their costumed identities when it comes to crime being involved. He is shown to also have a very close relationship with Commissioner James Gordon, viewing him like a father figure, and as seen in "I Am the Night" becomes extremely worried for him after he is badly injured and nearly dies after being shot by a criminal during a shoot out he was late to stop with his guilt causing him to quit as Batman for a while, though he comes to his senses later on.
1996–99: Superman: The Animated Series; Batman first guest stars in "World's Finest", he comes to Metropolis to stop Joker, who being bankrupt allies with Lex Luthor, to kill Superman for a million dollars, while also forming a brief business partnership with Lex as Bruce Wayne. He also dates Lois Lane as Wayne briefly much to the chagrin and jealousy of Clark Kent/Superman, though they put aside their differences and work to stop both Luthor and Joker. He next appears in "Knight Time", where he is revealed to have gone missing leading to Superman and Robin working together to stop crime in Gotham (with Superman disguised as him for a while) and find him, and when they do find him, they learn he is under Brainiac's control, who managed to infiltrate Wayne Enterprises computer systems, the latter wanting a secret weapon to help control the planet though he is eventually stopped. He then appears in the penultimate episode "The Demon Reborn" where he rescues Superman from Ra's al Ghul who wanted the former's strength for immortality after the Lazarus Pits began failing due to his continuous usage. The duo then team up to stop him and the Society of Shadows and at the end both acknowledge how well they work together, hinting at the eventual formation of the Justice League.
1997–99: The New Batman Adventures; a continuation of Batman: The Animated Series, Bruce now works with Barbara Gordon/Batgirl and Tim Drake/Robin, the former of whose secret identity he figured out in the interim between the two shows. Dick Grayson abandoned his Robin identity and left Gotham after an argument with Batman over knowing but not telling him Barbara's secret and his increased ruthlessness and manipulative behaviour as revealed in "Old Wounds", though he eventually returns and occasionally works with him as Nightwing and despite forgiving him, does not fully reconcile with his former mentor.
1999–2001: Batman Beyond; a middle-aged Batman retired from crime-fighting, after he suffered a mild heart attack during a rescue mission that forced him to use a gun in self defense, something he highly detests, though he didn't kill his attacker. Twenty years later, though initially reluctant, Bruce passes the mantle of Batman onto teenager Terry McGinnis (voiced by Will Friedle) after the latter experiences a similar tragedy to his own, the loss of a parent, thus becoming his mentor from that point onwards and guiding Terry from the Batcave.
2001: The Zeta Project; Both Bruce Wayne and the future Batman (Terry McGinnis) guest star in the episode "Shadows".
2001–04: Justice League; the original Batman becomes one of the founding members of the League, even financing the construction and improvement of both Watchtowers though does not officially join them, claiming not to be a "people" person and continuing as a part-timer (a fact established in the Batman Beyond two-parter episode "The Call"). He plays a pivotal role in stopping the Imperium Invasion in the premiere three parter episode, alongside J'onn J'onzz outwits and defeats Doctor Destiny after the latter manages to trap the rest of his teammates in their nightmares, meets an alternate version of himself who has become a dictator on his earth alongside his fellow lords and succeeds in convincing the latter that he is wrong and sets him on the right path, and in the three part season finale, risks his life in stopping the Thanagarian invasion. He is also shown having a mutual attraction to Wonder Woman as they flirt frequently evidenced in the episodes, "The Brave and the Bold", "Maid of Honor" and the finale where they share a kiss, while hiding from Thanagarian troops.
2002–04: Static Shock; Batman guest stars in "The Big Leagues" where he and Robin help Static stop Joker and his new gang of bang-baby metahumans from going on a crime spree, "Hard as Nails" where he helps Static thwart Poison Ivy and Harley Quinn's plans to use new bang baby Nails and rescue her while also learning Static's secret identity with the latter in turn learning of his as well, the two-parter "A League of Their Own" where he, the Justice League, Static and Gear fight Brainiac and "Future Shock" where both he and his older self from Batman Beyond appear with the former playing a minor role alongside Robin in stopping a villain Timecode and the latter a bigger one as he helps Static and his successor Terry rescue Static's future self from KOBRA; he appears in his "New Batman Adventures" attire for three episodes and in his "Justice League" outfit for one episode.
2004–06: Justice League Unlimited; a continuation of Justice League, he again plays instrumental roles in helping his allies, such as recruiting Green Arrow to the Justice League in "Initiation", saves Superman from Black Mercy's thrall in "For the Man Who Has Everything" and Wonder Woman with help from Zatanna after she is transformed into a pig by Circe in "This Little Piggy", in that episode he reveals that though he may have feelings for Diana, does not want to enter a relationship with her as he fears that it could cause problems in the team, (possibly due to seeing the status-quo damage caused by the relationship between John Stewart and Shayera Hol) and that she could become a target for his enemies, despite her capabilities of perfectly fending for herself.  He demonstrates to Amanda Waller, that she and Cadmus are only tools in Lex Luthor's plot to discredit the League, eventually succeeding. He also meets an alternate version of his older self and his successor Terry, in the episode "The Once and Future Thing Part Two: Time Warped" and along with Green Lantern are the only two leaguers to remember the events of the mission and here his feelings for Diana are briefly stressed here again. The episode "Epilogue", which is intended to serve as a true finale and conclusion to Batman Beyond and the DCAU as a whole, reveals that he is Terry's biological father, due to Waller's machinations, which he figured out sometime prior to the episode but chose not to tell Terry out of respect for his legal father, Warren. She came to admire and respect Batman over time after becoming a government liaison to the Justice League and seeing him save the day with his intelligence, tact and grit, despite their initial mutual hostility and realising the possibility of his eventual retirement or death as he aged thought a world without him and his skillset was unacceptable. She then created Project Batman Beyond to ensure he would have a successor, first by rewriting Warren McGinnis' DNA with a copy of Bruce's in the guise of a flu shot and then hired Bruce's former fiancée Andrea Beaumont a.k.a. Phantasm, to kill Terry's parents when he was 8 years old and under the same circumstances to trigger a trauma in the boy much like his biological father, though Beaumont out of respect (and love) for Bruce and his code did not go through with it leading to Waller shutting down the project, this allowed Mary McGinnis to give birth to another son and Terry's brother Matt, who is also Wayne's biological son. Though partially complete she would eventually succeed by fate's hands after Terry's father's murder compels him to become the new Dark Knight. While the revelation causes a brief strain in Bruce and Terry's relationship (though Terry's argument with Bruce, breaking up with his girlfriend Dana and his breaking off of the Justice League were all imagination), they reconcile.

Other
 1968–69: Superman, produced by Filmation; featured Batman in Batman with Robin the Boy Wonder segments; Batman segments were later repackaged as The Adventures of Superman and Batman with Robin the Boy Wonder (voiced by Olan Soule)
 1970: Batman appears in three animated educational shorts as part of Sesame Streets first season. Olan Soule reprises his role of Batman
 1972: The New Scooby-Doo Movies, produced by Hanna-Barbera; Batman and Robin appeared in episodes "The Dynamic Scooby-Doo Affair" (9/16/72) and "The Caped Crusader Caper" (12/16/72), where Olan Soule again portrays the Caped Crusader
 1990: Appeared in the Tiny Toon Adventures episode "Gang Busters", voiced by Charlie Adler
 2002: In The Simpsons episode "Large Marge", Bart and Milhouse watch a fabricated Batman episode in which Adam West and Burt Ward voice their Batman and Robin characters.
 1997: In the Animaniacs episode "Boo Wonder", Adam West plays "Spruce Wayne," a parody of Bruce Wayne.
 2004–08: The Batman; in this series, Bruce Wayne is a young crime fighter just three years into his career as Batman. He is voiced by Rino Romano.
 2008–11: Batman: The Brave and the Bold; based in part on the comic book series of the same name, the series has Batman (voiced by Diedrich Bader) team-up with several other DC Comics heroes
 2010–13: Young Justice; the animated series of Young Justice features Justice League members as well as Batman voiced by Bruce Greenwood, who played the role in the animated film Batman: Under the Red Hood 2012–2015: Robot Chicken DC Comics Specials, featuring Seth Green as Batman
 2012: Robot Chicken DC Comics Special 2014: Robot Chicken DC Comics Special 2: Villains in Paradise 2015: Robot Chicken DC Comics Special III: Magical Friendship 2012: New Teen Titans short, "Red X Unmasked"; a cameo appearance as one of the people under the mask of Red X and says his famous line from Batman: The Animated Series, "I am Vengeance, I am the Night, I am," but his mask comes off before he can say his name; voiced by Kevin Michael Richardson
 2013–present: Teen Titans Go!; Batman makes non-speaking cameo appearances in several episodes, including "La Larva de Amor", "Girl's Night Out", "Books", "Sidekick", "Slumber Party", "Thanksgiving" and "Real Boy Adventures". He is the protagonist of the "TV Knight" episodes, in which he and Commissioner Gordon (and sometimes other characters) hang out and watch TV, while a different frame story takes place each time. Batman's only speaking role was in the season five episode "Real Orangins", in a flashback animated in the style of Batman: The Animated Series where Robin explains in a comedic fashion how he and Batman parted ways; Kevin Conroy reprised his role.
 2013: Beware the Batman; a computer-animated series that features Katana as Batman's sidekick (voiced by Anthony Ruivivar).
 2016–18: Justice League Action; Batman appears as one of the three lead characters in the show, with Kevin Conroy reprising his role. His child-self in the episode "Trick or Threat" is voiced by Tara Strong.
 2019: Unikitty!; The Lego Movie incarnation of Batman appears in the episode "BatKitty" with Will Arnett reprising his role.
 2019–Present: DC Super Hero Girls; Batman makes occasional appearances on the series. He is voiced by Keith Ferguson.
 2019–Present: Harley Quinn; Batman is a supporting character in DC Universe's animated series based on Harley Quinn, with Diedrich Bader reprising his role.
 2019: Scooby-Doo and Guess Who?; in the episode "What a Night, For a Dark Knight!" Batman teams up once again with Mystery Inc. to investigate Alfred's kidnapping by the Man-Bat. Kevin Conroy once again provided Batman's voice.
 2019: Young Justice: Outsiders; A continuation of Young Justice, it focuses on the events that take place directly after Young Justice.
 2022–present: Batwheels; a series focusing on Batman and his allies and sentient vehicles fighting crime. Batman is voiced here by Ethan Hawke.
 An animated series titled Batman: Caped Crusader was announced in May 2021, and the project was led by Bruce Timm, J. J. Abrams, and Matt Reeves. It was said to be a reimagining of the Caped Crusader that returns to the character's film noir roots and focus on the character's earlier years of fighting crime and also before he formed an alliance with Commissioner James Gordon and the GCPD. It is planned to premiere on Cartoon Network and would have also premiered on HBO Max. However, in August 2022, it was announced that the series would not be streaming on HBO Max as originally planned, and that it would be shopped to different streaming services for pickup, with Apple TV+, Hulu, and Netflix expressing interest in the series. On March 9, 2023, it was announced the series will be released on Amazon Prime Video with a two-season order.

Radio
Beginning in March 1945, Batman and Robin made regular appearances on the radio drama The Adventures of Superman on the Mutual Broadcasting System, including solo stories when series star, Bud Collyer had time off. Batman was voiced by Matt Crowley, Stacy Harris and Gary Merrill, with Ronald Liss as Robin.

Efforts were later made to launch a Batman radio series in 1943 and again in 1950, but neither came to fruition. The 1943 pilot "The Case of the Drowning Seal" was scripted with Scott Douglas as Batman; if the script was recorded, no copy survives. The September 1950 pilot for The Batman Mystery Club was recorded with Richard Devon as Batman and Ronald Liss as Robin.

In 1989, an original radio drama, Batman: The Lazarus Syndrome, was produced by Dirk Maggs for BBC Radio 4. Bob Sessions was the voice of Batman.

A second Maggs production aired on BBC Radio 1 in 1994, this time adapting the comic book storyline Batman: Knightfall. It was adapted, produced and directed by Maggs—with music composed by Mark Russell—who had also made Superman: Doomsday & Beyond on BBC Radio 5. This show, however was not commissioned of its own, but rather to be three-minute episodes on the Mark Goodier Show. This meant it was written with a sense of immediacy; having to make an instant effect and each three-minute segment contains a major plot development or sound effect stunt and ends on a cliffhanger. DC acknowledged the effort in an issue Shadow of The Bat by having villains jump past a sign reading "Dirk Maggs Radio". Michael Gough reprised the role of Alfred Pennyworth from the Burton/Schumacher film series.

Newspaper

From 1943 to 1946, Batman and Robin appeared in a syndicated daily newspaper comic strip produced by the McClure Syndicate. Other versions appeared in 1953, 1966, and 1989. The original run is collected in the book Batman: The Dailies. One more comic strip series ran briefly after the success of the 1989 film.

Books
Batman appears in a novel by cyberpunk/horror novelist John Shirley, titled Batman: Dead White from Del Rey. Many other novels and short story collections featuring Batman have been published over the years, including novelizations of each of the recent movies (such as Batman and The Dark Knight Rises) and many of the comic book arcs.

There are also several more scholarly works, aimed at either Batman's history or art, such as Les Daniels' Batman: The Complete History, Will Brooker's Batman Unmasked: Analysing a Cultural Icon and compilations such as Batman: Cover to Cover: The Greatest Comic Book Covers of the Dark Knight. In 2004, The Batman Handbook: The Ultimate Training Manual, written by Scott Beatty was published by Quirk Books. Written in the same style as The Worst-Case Scenario Survival Handbook series, the book explained the basics on how to be Batman. Amongst the skills included in the book are "How to Train a Sidekick", "How to Execute a Backflip", "How to Throw a Grappling Hook", and "How to Survive a Poison Gas Attack". Finally, there are of course countless sticker, coloring, activity, and other children's books featuring the Dark Knight.

Foreign comicsBatman: Child of Dreams by Kia Asamiya—mangaBatman: Death Mask by Yoshinori Natsume—mangaBat-Manga!: The Secret History of Batman in Japan by Jiro Kuwata—mangaBatman trong Hőtữ Thần by Nguyễn Th—Vietnamese comics

Novelty singles
Several musical singles featuring cast members of the television show singing in-character were released in 1966: Burgess Meredith as the Penguin in "The Capture" and "The Escape", Frank Gorshin as the Riddler in "The Riddler", and Adam West as Batman in "Miranda". In 1976 West performed a pair of novelty songs, "The Story of Batman" and "Batman and Robin", for Target Records. All six of these recordings (sans the b-sides to Gorshin and West's singles) were later included on the 1997 compilation, Batmania: Songs Inspired by Batman TV Series.

In 1966, Burt Ward also recorded a limited "disc jokey only" release with Frank Zappa called "Boy Wonder, I Love You".

Also in 1966, British novelty group The Scaffold produced a single called "Goodbat Nightman" (lyrics by Roger McGough, who "has written several poems" about Batman and Robin).

Audio drama
Following the popularity of the Adam West television series, a pair of LPs were released in 1966 on MGM's "Leo the Lion" label. Each contained three dramatizations, including stories adapted from Batman comic books:
The Official Adventures Of Batman And Robin:
 The Legend of Batman and Robin
 The Penguin's Plunder
 The Joker's Revenge
More Official Adventures of Batman & Robin:
 The Marriage of Batman and Batwoman
 The Fake Boy Wonder
 When Batman Became a Coward

Throughout the 1970s Batman was the subject of a number of Power Records Book-and-record sets, as well as records unaccompanied by books:

45 rpm book and record sets:
 Batman: Stacked Cards
 Batman: Robin Meets Man-Bat

7" 33 rpm records (no comic):
 Batman: If Music be the Food of Death
 Batman: The Scarecrow's Mirages
 Batman: Catwoman's Revenge (1976)

33 rpm 12 book and record sets:
 Batman: Gorilla City & Mystery of the Scarecrow Corpse
 Batman (Collects Stacked Cards, The Scarecrow's Mirage, Challenge of the Catwoman, If Music Be the Food of Death)
 Batman (Collects Robin Meets Man Bat, Gorilla City, Mystery of the Scarecrow Corpse, The Catwoman's Revenge)
 A Super Hero Christmas (segment Batman: Christmas Carol Caper)

The 1980 mini-series, The Untold Legend of the Batman was available in a special "MPI Audio Edition." Each of the three issues were accompanied by an audio cassette containing a performance of the text of the issue, with musical cues.

As part of its DC Superheroes collection, in 1982 Fisher-Price released Batman: The Case of the Laughing Sphinx, an audio cassette accompanied by a hard back illustrated book.

In 2007, the audiobook publisher GraphicAudio licensed DC Comics properties to adapt as audiodramas. They have produced three adaptations of Batman novels: Batman: Dead White by John Shirley, Batman: Inferno by Alex Irvine, and Alan Grant's Batman: The Stone King. Batman also appears as a supporting cast member in the GraphicAudio's adaptations of Crisis on Infinite Earths, Infinite Crisis and JLA: Exterminators.

Podcasts
In 2020, it was announced that David Goyer had signed a deal to create an audio drama podcast for Spotify called Batman Unburied. The 2022 series stars Winston Duke as Bruce Wayne and Jason Isaacs as Alfred. The supporting cast includes Hasan Minhaj, Gina Rodriguez, Sam Witwer, Emmy Raver-Lampman, Jessica Marie Garcia, Jim Pirri, Lance Reddick, Toks Olagundoye, John Rhys-Davies and Ashly Burch.Batman: The Audio Adventures is a comedic radio drama podcast series featuring the DC Comics character Batman. The 2021 show, DC's first scripted podcast, is produced by DC Entertainment, Blue Ribbon Content and HBO Max. The series is meant to be an homage to the original 1966 Batman TV series as well as the 1990s Batman: The Animated Series. It is directed and written by Dennis McNicholas, a writer for Saturday Night Live. Production companies involved with the series were slated to consist of Insurrection Media and WarnerMedia. The series was executive produced by Kiliaen Van Rensselaer, Deborah Henderson, and Jon Berg.Harley Quinn and The Joker: Sound Mind is the second podcast released under the partnership between Spotify and Warner Bros. Released in 2023, it features Christina Ricci as Harley Quinn and Billy Magnussen as The Joker. Justin Hartley also appears voicing Bruce Wayne.

Video games

Video games featuring Batman include:Batman (1986) for the ZX Spectrum, MSX and Amstrad PCW; now known as Batman 3DBatman: The Caped Crusader (1988) for various 8-bit and 16-bit platformsBatman (1989) for Mega Drive/Genesis, Nintendo Entertainment System (NES), Lynx, Amiga, Sinclair ZX Spectrum and other platforms. (In October 1989, the Amiga 500 was bundled with this game as part of the Batman Pack, which was sold in the United Kingdom and was a phenomenal success)Batman (1990) for Arcade: Based on the 1989 filmBatman: Return of the Joker (1991) for Nintendo Entertainment System (NES) and Game BoyBatman Returns (1993) for Nintendo Entertainment System (NES), Super NES, Mega Drive/Genesis, Mega CD/Sega CD, Game Gear, and Atari LynxBatman: The Animated Series (1993) for Game BoyBatman & Robin: The Animated Series (1993) for Game GearThe Adventures of Batman & Robin (1994) for Super NES, Mega Drive/Genesis, Mega CD/Sega CD, and Game GearBatman Forever (1996) for Super NES, Game Boy, Mega Drive/Genesis, and Game GearBatman Forever: The Arcade Game (1996) for Arcade, PlayStation and Sega SaturnBatman & Robin (1997) for Game.com and the PlayStationBatman Beyond: Return of the Joker (2000) for Nintendo 64 and the PlayStationBatman: Chaos in Gotham (2001) for Game Boy ColorBatman: Gotham City Racer (2001) A racing game for PlayStationBatman: Vengeance (2001) for GameCube, PlayStation 2, PC, Game Boy Advance and XboxBatman: Dark Tomorrow (2003) for Xbox and GameCube (voiced by Julian Fletcher)Batman: Rise of Sin Tzu (2004) for PlayStation 2, Xbox, GameCube, and Game Boy AdvanceBatman Begins (2005) for PlayStation 2, Xbox, GameCube and Game Boy Advance (2005)Batman: The Brave and the Bold – The Videogame (2010) for Wii and Nintendo DS: Based on the television series of the same name (voiced by Diedrich Bader)Gotham City Impostors (2012) for PlayStation 3, Xbox 360 and Windows: A downloadable multi-player first-person shooter game via PlayStation Network, Xbox Live Arcade and Games for Windows Live; a "team deathmatch" game, with one team dressed like Batman and the other dressed like The JokerBatman: The Telltale Series (2016) for Windows, PlayStation 3, PlayStation 4, Xbox 360, Xbox One, iOS, Android, and Nintendo Switch: An episodic adventure game (voiced by Troy Baker)Batman: The Enemy Within (2017) for Windows, MacOS, PlayStation 4, Xbox One, iOS, Android, and Nintendo Switch: The sequel to Batman: The Telltale Series (voiced by Troy Baker)

Lego: BatmanLego Batman: The Video Game (2008): a video game in the style of Lego Star Wars based on the LEGO Batman toyline (vocals by Steve Blum)Lego Batman 2: DC Superheroes (2012): the sequel to Lego Batman: The Video Game (voiced by Troy Baker)The Lego Movie Videogame (2014): A Lego-themed version of Batman appears, with cutscenes featuring archive footage of Will Arnett from The Lego Movie, while his voice in gameplay mode is provided by Jim Meskimen voice-matching Arnett.Lego Batman 3: Beyond Gotham (2014): the sequel to Lego Batman 2: DC Superheroes (voiced by Troy Baker)Lego Dimensions (2015): Troy Baker reprises Batman in this multi-franchise game. The Lego Movie version also appears in this version voiced by Will Arnett. Batman is one of the three main heroes alongside The Lego Movie's Wyldstyle and Gandalf of The Lord of the Rings as he works with them to rescue Robin from Lord Vortech. Additional content also includes an adaptation of The Lego Batman Movie.Lego DC Super-Villains (2018): Batman appears as a playable character, with Kevin Conroy now assuming his reprisal from Baker.The Lego Movie 2 Videogame (2019): A Lego-themed version of Batman appears, with Will Arnett reprising his role

Batman ArkhamBatman: Arkham Asylum (2009) for Xbox 360, PlayStation 3, and Windows PC (voiced by Kevin Conroy)Batman: Arkham City (2011) for Xbox 360, PlayStation 3, Windows, and Wii U: The sequel to Batman: Arkham Asylum (voiced by Kevin Conroy)Batman: Arkham City Lockdown (2011): spin-off to Arkham CityBatman: Arkham Origins (2013) for Xbox 360, PlayStation 3, Windows, and Wii U: Prequel to Arkham Asylum and Arkham City (voiced by Roger Craig Smith)Batman: Arkham Origins Blackgate (2013) for Nintendo 3DS and PlayStation Vita: 2.5D platform game set between Arkham Origins and Arkham Asylum.Batman: Arkham Knight (2015): the sequel to Arkham City and the final game in the Arkham series, for Xbox One, PlayStation 4, Microsoft WindowsBatman: Arkham VR (2016) for PlayStation 4, PlayStation VR and Microsoft Windows (voiced by Kevin Conroy)

Other DC GamesJustice League Task Force (1995) for Super NES and Mega Drive/Genesis: A fighting game featuring several DC characters, including Batman.Justice League Heroes (2006) for Xbox, PlayStation 2, PlayStation Portable and Nintendo DS (voiced by Ron Perlman)Mortal Kombat vs. DC Universe (2008) for PlayStation 3 Xbox 360: A crossover fighting game featuring characters from DC Comics and Mortal Kombat (voiced by David Gazanna)DC Universe Online for PC, PlayStation 3, PlayStation 4, and Xbox One: A MMORPG where Batman, among others, trains new player-controlled heroes (voiced again by Kevin Conroy)Injustice: Gods Among Us (2013) for Xbox 360, PlayStation 3, PlayStation 4, Wii U, and Windows: A fighting game featuring several DC characters, including Batman (voiced again by Kevin Conroy)Injustice 2 (2017) for PlayStation 4 and Xbox One: the sequel to Injustice: Gods Among Us (voiced again by Kevin Conroy)Justice League VR: The Complete Experience (2017) features a driving, shooting level with the player taking control of Batman and the Batmobile to destroy simulated tanks in GothamDC Unchained (2018) for Android: A fighting game featuring several DC characters, including Batman.Gotham Knights (2022) for PlayStation 5, Xbox Series X and PC: A videogame based on Batman's closest allies. Bruce Wayne appears in the announcement trailer for the game, voiced by Michael Antonakos.Justice League: Cosmic Chaos (2023) for Playstation 4, Playstation 5, Xbox One, Xbox Series X, PC and Nintendo Switch: A videogame based on the superhero team of the same name, with Diedrich Bader reprising his role from various DC media.Suicide Squad: Kill the Justice League (2023) for PlayStation 5, Xbox Series X and PC: A videogame based on the anti-hero team of the same name. Batman appears in the trailer for the game, voiced by Kevin Conroy in his final performance due to his death from cancer in November 2022.

LittleBigPlanetLittleBigPlanet 2 (2011) for PlayStation 3 and LittleBigPlanet PS Vita (2012) for PlayStation Vita
are puzzle-platform games with several DC characters, including Batman (voiced by Gary Martin).

Other video gamesThe Revenge of Shinobi features a non-authorized Batman as a boss.
The 8-bit Nintendo Entertainment System game Final Fantasy features "Badman", a character with strong resemblances to Batman, as one of the enemies of the final area.
The 2017 game Fortnite has Batman-themed cosmetics such as Catwoman and Batman outfits and a Gotham City location in the map. This was added in honor of the 80th anniversary of Batman.
Batman appears as a playable character in SINoALICE, voiced by Kōichi Yamadera.
Batman appears as a playable character in MultiVersus, with Kevin Conroy reprising his role from various DC media.

Live performance
Batman Live!
During the summer/fall of 1966 Adam West and Frank Gorshin went on a tour as Batman and the Riddler to promote the new Batman movie and the series. They were usually accompanied by several bands before the featured event that saw Batman and the Riddler exchange corny jokes as well as a song performed by West. The tour most famously stopped at Shea Stadium in New York on June 25, 1966 and City Park in New Orleans on November 26, 1966.

Musical theatre
While a parody of a Batman musical was featured in one of the most recent series' comics, in 2002, Jim Steinman, David Ives, and Tim Burton had worked on a theatre production called Batman: The Musical although it was ultimately cancelled. Steinman has revealed five songs from the musical. The first is the opening theme for "Gotham City" and the entry of Batman with his tortured solo "The Graveyard Shift"; followed by "The Joker's Song (Where Does He Get All Those Wonderful Toys?)", "The Catwoman's Song (I Need All The Love I Can Get)", "We're Still The Children We Once Were" (the climactic sequence) and "In The Land Of The Pig The Butcher Is King", sung by the corrupt blood-suckers ruling Gotham, covered on the Meat Loaf album Bat Out of Hell III: The Monster Is Loose. These songs can be heard at the Batman: The Musical memorial site, Dark Knight of the Soul.

A Batman musical is also parodied in the animated series Batman Beyond. The episode "Out of the Past" (first aired October 21, 2000) opens with Bruce Wayne and Terry McGinnis attending a performance of (a fictional) Batman: The Musical, featuring caricatures of prominent members of the Rogues Gallery (the Joker, the Penguin, Two-Face, Catwoman, Poison Ivy, and Harley Quinn). Series creator Paul Dini, who wrote the episode in question, also wrote a song for the fictitious musical entitled Superstitious and Cowardly Lot.

An episode of the sketch comedy show MADtv also featured a Batman: The Musical parody called Batman V: Out of the Cave which starred Tommy Tune as Batman, and Ben Vereen as Robin.

A live stage show was also created, called Batman Live: World Tour. The show is a unique fusion of live-action theatre, magic, stunts, digital projection and music from an 85-piece orchestra and choir. The tour began at Manchester, England, in Summer 2011 and visited arenas throughout the UK and Europe before arriving in North America in Summer 2012.

In 2012, the Internet theatre troupe StarKid Productions created a musical titled Holy Musical B@man!, which went on YouTube on April 13. It was performed in Chicago from March 16–25, and because of copyright laws, tickets were free. Batman is portrayed by Joseph (Joe) Walker.

Music
The album Knightfall by multinational Swedish band Silent Images, is based on the Batman: Knightfall story arc, with Batman serving as a central character, the "Nightly Priest". The album explores the underlying sociopolitical themes in the Batman universe, and his struggle against "The Venomous One", which is the album's interpretation of Bane.

 Fine arts 
Starting with the Pop Art period, and on a continuing basis, since the 1960s, the character of Batman has been "appropriated" by multiple visual artists and incorporated into contemporary artwork, most notably by Andy Warhol, Roy Lichtenstein, Mel Ramos, Dulce Pinzon, Mr. Brainwash, Raymond Pettibon, Peter Saul, and others.

Games, action figures, and other toys

Hundreds of Batman action figures, die-cast models, and other items have been released. Many companies have acquired the rights to make Batman merchandise, including:

 Ideal—Captain Action
 Mego—Action figures and dolls
 Corgi—Die-cast metal vehicles
 Remco—Playsets and roleplaying toys
 Toy Biz—Action figures
 Ertl—Die-cast figures & vehicles and model kits
 Applause—PVC figures and dolls
 Hasbro—Action figures
 Monogram—Bobble heads
 Mattel—Action figures and jigsaw puzzles
 Lego—Building bricks and minifigures
 Bandai Japan—S.H. Figuarts

Batman has appeared as a HeroClix figure, along with other Batman characters, in the following HeroClix sets:

 Hypertime
 Cosmic Justice
 Unleashed
 Legacy
 Icons

For April 2006, Lego introduced a Batman line which also includes characters such as the Joker and Two-Face, at American International Toy Fair.

In 2015, Looney Labs in partnership with Cryptozoic Entertainment released a Batman-themed version of its card game Fluxx with art by Derek Ring based on The New Batman Adventures.

Postage stamps
In 2006, the United States Postal Service (USPS) issued a DC Comics Superheroes pane of 20 stamps which included a stamp of Batman.

To celebrate the 75th anniversary of Batman, USPS released a limited edition stamp series on October 9, 2014. Four versions of the superhero were depicted from the four eras of comic book history: Golden, Silver, Bronze and Modern. In addition, it included four versions of the Bat-Signal.

Theme park attractions

Several Six Flags theme parks, formerly owned by Warner Bros., opened live-action "Batman Stunt Shows" as the movies increased in popularity. The now closed Six Flags Astroworld in Houston, Texas was home to a standing roller coaster known as Batman: The Escape. Six Flags Over Texas in Arlington, Texas is home to two roller coasters called Mr. Freeze, and Batman: The Ride. Six Flags México in Mexico City, Mexico has also a looping, suspended roller coaster named Batman: The Ride (Six Flags St. Louis has the same ride, as does Six Flags Great America in Gurnee, Illinois) as well as twin roller coasters named Batman and Robin: The Chiller. On the latter attraction, riders may ride on either the Batman or Robin versions of the coaster. But unfortunately in the 2007 off-season, the ride was removed after a long history of technical difficulties and occasionally breaking down. Six Flags Over Georgia contains a Gotham City area that contains the same Batman: The Ride and also features a looping coaster called The Mindbender that was adapted to fit the color tone of the Riddler after Batman Forever came out to fit the Gotham City section of the park it shares with Batman: The Ride. Six Flags Magic Mountain in Valencia, California has two Batman-themed coasters, the suspended coaster Batman: The Ride, and The Riddler's Revenge, a stand-up type roller coaster. This Six Flags park also features an entire themed area called "Gotham City" complete with architecture to match that of the fictional Gotham City. Warner Bros. Movie World in the Gold Coast, Australia, also has two Batman-themed rides. Batman Adventure – The Ride, revamped in 2001, is a motion simulator style simulator ride while Batwing Spaceshot is a vertical free-fall ride.

In 2008, The Dark Knight Coaster opened in Six Flags Great Adventure and Six Flags Great America. Based on The Dark Knight film, they are Wild Mouse roller coasters, indoors, heavily themed, and give riders a feeling that they are being stalked by the Joker. Six Flags New England was originally going to receive this roller coaster; however, due to problems with building permits, the park scratched the project and then sent the coaster to Six Flags México.

Recurring cast and characters

See also
Batman (disambiguation)
Robin in other media
Barbara Gordon in other media
Joker in other media
Riddler in other media
Scarecrow in other media
Penguin in other media
Bane in other media

References

External links
 Warner Bros. official website
 Warner Bros. official Batman Shop
 Batman Begins official site
 The New Batman Adventures—Official Warner Bros. site
 Batman: The Animated Series—Official site
 Batman Beyond—Official site
 Dark Knight of the Soul (Batman: The Musical Memorial)''—Collects all known information about this canceled project, as well as Steinman's demo recordings
 Batman Films and TV series at the Internet Movie Database
 Encyclopedia of Television

Batman in other media